Erebus is the Greek god of darkness as well as a region of the Greek underworld.

Erebus  may also refer to:

 Mount Erebus in Israel, more commonly known as the Mount of Beatitudes
 Erebus (crater), a crater on Mars named after the ship
 Erebus Montes, a group of mountains in the Diacria quadrangle of Mars
 Erebus (moth), a genus of noctuid moths
 Mount Erebus, an Antarctic volcano
 Mount Erebus disaster, a DC-10 crash on the mountain in 1979
 Erebus: The Aftermath, a New Zealand television miniseries about the accident
 Erebus: Operation Overdue, a New Zealand documentary about the disaster
 Erebus crystal, a type of feldspar 
 Erebus Motorsport, an Australian motor racing team
 "Erebus", a 2004 song by The Amenta, from the album Occasus
 Erebus Cove, a cove on Auckland Island, gateway of the former settlement of Hardwicke
 Erebos (album), an album by Hate
 Erebus I, an extended play recording by American electronic music producer Notaker

Ships 
 HMS Erebus, five ships of Britain's Royal Navy, most famously:
 HMS Erebus (1826), a part of Franklin's failed expedition to find the Northwest Passage
 Erebus-class monitor, a class of Royal Navy ships
 , a briefly-held name for the USS Squando (1865)